Conques-sur-Orbiel is a commune in the Aude department in southern France.

Population

Chapel
About 2 km north of the town lies a chapel constructed in 1885 for property owner Camille Don de Cépian and designed by Gabriel Pasquier. The chapel is crumbling but was recently stabilized.

2018 Flood
In mid-October 2018, Villegailhenc, Conques-sur-Orbiel, and Villardonnel, and Trèbes, along with nearby areas along the river Aude, were devastated when the river flooded after intense rain. 12 people were killed, including a nun. Natural deposits of high arsenic content were disturbed & spread by these flood waters, levels of 100 ug/L have been subsequently measured in affected areas.

See also
Communes of the Aude department
List of medieval bridges in France

References

External links

 SENIORBIEL - Seniors Conques sur Orbiel
 Conques-sur-Orbiel sur le site de l'Institut géographique national

Communes of Aude
Aude communes articles needing translation from French Wikipedia